Joaquín Díaz Bonilla (born 12 April 1989) is an Argentine rugby union player for  in the United Rugby Championship. He also plays for Old Glory DC of Major League Rugby (MLR) in the U.S. He has played for Leicester Tigers in England's Premiership Rugby and for the national Argentina team, The Pumas. His playing position is fly-half.

Bonilla played domestically in Argentina for Hindú Club in the Torneo de la URBA, before turning professional with the Super Rugby side Jaguares, both sides play in Buenos Aires.  Diaz Bonilla started at fly half for Jaguares in the 2019 Super Rugby Final, where they lost to New Zealand's Crusaders.

During the 2019 Rugby World Cup Diaz Bonilla played for Racing 92 in France's Top 14 as cover for Finn Russell and Ben Volavola.

Bonilla returned to the Jaguares for the aborted 2020 Super Rugby season, featuring in 3 games before the season was cut short due to coronavirus.

On 21 September 2020 he signed for Leicester Tigers in England's Premiership Rugby, he made his debut as a replacement against London Irish but played only five times before his release was announced on 16 June 2021.

On 15 August 2021 Bonilla joined , based in Durban, South Africa, for their debut United Rugby Championship season.

References

External links
 Jaguares Profile
 itsrugby Profile

Jaguares (Super Rugby) players
Rugby union fly-halves
Argentine rugby union players
1989 births
Living people
Hindú Club players
Argentina international rugby union players
Leicester Tigers players
Racing 92 players
Sharks (rugby union) players
Sharks (Currie Cup) players
Rugby union players from Buenos Aires
Old Glory DC players